Ausra Fridrikas (born ; formerly Ziukiene; 30 April 1967 in Lithuania) is a Lithuanian–Austrian handball player and World champion from 1990. She first played for Soviet Union, later for Lithuania and finally for Austria. She was voted World Handball Player of the Year 1999<ref name=ihf>Previous World Handball Players  (Retrieved on December 14, 2007)</ref> by the International Handball Federation. She was selected most valuable player'' at the 1999 World championship, where she participated on the Austrian team and received a bronze medal.

Personal life
Fridrikas married the Lithuanian international footballer Robertas Fridrikas, and their son Lukas also plays football professionally.

References

1967 births
Living people
People from Varėna
Soviet female handball players
Lithuanian female handball players
Austrian female handball players
Handball players at the 2000 Summer Olympics
Olympic handball players of Austria
Lithuanian emigrants to Austria
Austrian people of Lithuanian descent
Expatriate handball players
Lithuanian expatriate sportspeople in Spain
Lithuanian expatriate sportspeople in Austria
Austrian expatriate sportspeople in Norway
Austrian expatriate sportspeople in Denmark